Magic Kingdom Park, previously known as Walt Disney World Magic Kingdom (1971–1994) and The Magic Kingdom (1994–2017), is a theme park at the Walt Disney World Resort in Bay Lake, Florida, near Orlando, Florida. Owned and operated by The Walt Disney Company through its Parks, Experiences and Products division, the park opened on October 1, 1971, as "Walt Disney World Magic Kingdom", the first of four theme parks at the resort. The park was initialized by Walt Disney and designed by WED Enterprises. Its layout and attractions are based on Disneyland Park in Anaheim, California, and are dedicated to fairy tales and Disney characters.

The park is represented by Cinderella Castle, inspired by the fairy tale castle featured in the 1950 film. In 2019, the park hosted 20.9 million visitors, making it the most visited theme park in the world for the thirteenth consecutive year and the most visited theme park in North America for at least the past nineteen years.

History

Planning

Although Walt Disney had been highly involved in planning EPCOT, he died before he could see the vision through. After Walt's death, Walt Disney Productions began construction on Magic Kingdom and the entire resort in 1967. The park was built as a larger, improved version of Disneyland Park in California.

Magic Kingdom was built over a series of tunnels called utilidors, a portmanteau of utility and corridor, allowing employees (called "cast members") or VIP guests to move through the park out of sight.

The area around the utilidors was filled in with dirt removed from the Seven Seas Lagoon, which was being constructed at the same time. The utilidors were built in the initial construction and were not extended as the park expanded. The tunnels were intended to be designed into all subsequent Walt Disney World parks but were set aside mostly because of financial constraints. Epcot's Future World and Disney Springs' Pleasure Island each have a smaller network of utilidors.

Opening and operation

Magic Kingdom Park opened as the first part of the Walt Disney World Resort on October 1, 1971, commencing concurrently with Disney's Contemporary Resort and Disney's Polynesian Village Resort. It opened with twenty-three attractions, three unique to the park and twenty replicas of attractions at Disneyland, split into six themed lands, five copies of those at Disneyland (Main Street, U.S.A., Adventureland, Frontierland, Fantasyland, and Tomorrowland) and the Magic Kingdom exclusive of Liberty Square. The Walt Disney Company promised to increase this number with a combination of replicas and unique attractions. While there is no individual dedication to Magic Kingdom, the dedication by Roy O. Disney for the entire resort was placed within its gates.

The only land added to the original roster of lands in the park was Mickey's Toontown Fair. The land originally opened in 1988 as Mickey's Birthdayland to celebrate Mickey Mouse's 60th birthday. Later the land was renovated as Mickey's Starland and eventually to Mickey's Toontown Fair. The land was home to attractions such as Mickey's Country House, Minnie's Country House, The Barnstormer at Goofy's Wiseacre Farm, and Donald's Boat. It closed on February 12, 2011, to make way for the expansion of Fantasyland. The Walt Disney World Railroad station in Mickey's Toontown Fair, which opened with Mickey's Birthdayland in 1988, was closed for the duration of the construction. In 2012, the space where Mickey's Toontown Fair sat reopened as a part of Fantasyland, in a sub-land called the Storybook Circus, where the Dumbo the Flying Elephant was relocated. The Barnstormer was retained and was re-themed to The Great Goofini.

Since opening day, Magic Kingdom has been closed temporarily because of seven hurricanes: Floyd, Charley, Frances, Jeanne, Wilma, Matthew, and Irma. The first non-hurricane related day the park has closed is on September 11, 2001, due to the terrorist attacks that day. Walt Disney World was closed from March 15, 2020 to July 11, 2020 due to the COVID-19 pandemic. In addition, there are four "phases" of park closure when Magic Kingdom exceeds capacity, ranging from restricted access for most guests (Phase 1) to full closure for everyone, even cast members (Phase 4).

"Magic Kingdom" was often used as an unofficial nickname for Disneyland before Walt Disney World was built. The official tagline for Disneyland is "The Happiest Place On Earth", while the tagline for Magic Kingdom is "The Most Magical Place On Earth". 
Up until the early 1990s, Magic Kingdom was officially known as "Walt Disney World Magic Kingdom", and was never printed without the Walt Disney World prefix. This purpose was to differentiate between the park and Disneyland in California. In 1994, to differentiate it from Disneyland, the park was officially renamed Magic Kingdom Park. Like all Disney theme parks, the official name of the park does not start with an article ("the"), though it is commonly referred to that way; however, a sign on the railroad station at the front of the park reads "The Magic Kingdom".

Alcoholic beverages had been prohibited from the park since its opening, but this policy has changed in recent years. In 2012, the Be Our Guest restaurant opened selling wine and beer for the first time. This was the only place in the park where alcohol was permitted until December 2014 when four additional restaurants began selling beer and wine including Cinderella's Royal Table, Liberty Tree Tavern, Tony's Town Square Restaurant, and the Jungle Navigation Co. Ltd. Skipper Canteen. And finally in 2018, the park officially became the second Magic Kingdom-style park to serve alcohol at all table service restaurants, after Disneyland Paris in 1993.

In October 2018, The Wall Street Journal reported the theme park is becoming a popular spot for families to scatter the ashes of loved ones with the Haunted Mansion being the favorite location. The practice is unlawful and prohibited on Disney property and anyone spreading cremated remains will be escorted from the park.

Park layout and attractions 

Magic Kingdom is divided into six themed "lands." It is designed like a wheel, with the hub in front of Cinderella Castle. The Walt Disney World Railroad circles around the entire  perimeter of the park and makes stops at Main Street, U.S.A., Frontierland, and Fantasyland. The attraction had four steam locomotives which were all originally built by the Baldwin Locomotive Works between 1916 and 1928.

Main Street, U.S.A.

Symbolically, Main Street, U.S.A. is themed as an early-20th century American town, inspired by Walt Disney's childhood home of Marceline, Missouri. Symbolically, Main Street represents the park's "opening credits," where guests pass under the train station (the opening curtain), then view the names of key personnel along the windows of the buildings' upper floors. Many windows bear the name of a fictional business, such as "Seven Summits Expeditions, Frank G. Wells President", with each representing a tribute to significant people connected to the Disney company and the development of the Walt Disney World Resort. It features stylistic influences from around the country. Taking its inspiration from New England to Missouri, this design is most noticeable in the four corners in the middle of Main Street, where each of the four corner buildings represents a different architectural style. There is no opera house as there is at Disneyland; instead, there is the Town Square Theater. Christopher George Weaver, the "mayor" of Main Street U.S.A. and one of the park's most important figures, greeted guests here for 26 years before he died in 2017.

Main Street is lined with shops selling merchandise and food. City Hall contains the Guest Relations lobby, where cast members provide information and assistance. A working barber shop gives haircuts for a fee. The Emporium carries a wide variety of Disney souvenirs such as plush toys, collectible pins and Mickey-ear hats. Tony's Town Square Restaurant and The Plaza Restaurant are table-service locations. At the end of Main Street is Casey's Corner. The Main Street Confectionery sells sweets priced by their weight, such as candied apples, crisped rice treats, chocolates, cookies and fudge. Most windows bear the name of people who were influential at Disney parks. An example of a classic Main Street, U.S.A. attraction is the  narrow-gauge Walt Disney World Railroad, which transports guests around the park, making stops at Main Street, U.S.A., Frontierland, and Fantasyland. Main Street, U.S.A. also has the Main Street Vehicles attraction, which includes a  narrow gauge tramway with horse-drawn streetcars, and several old-fashioned motor vehicles.

In the distance beyond the end of Main Street stands Cinderella Castle. The second stories of all the buildings along Main Street are shorter than the first stories, and the third stories are even shorter than the second, and the top windows of the castle are much smaller than they appear. The resulting visual effect is that the buildings appear to be larger and taller than they really are.

The park contains two additional tributes: the Partners statue of Walt Disney and Mickey Mouse in front of Cinderella Castle and the Sharing the Magic statue of Roy O. Disney sitting with Minnie Mouse in the Town Square section of Main Street, U.S.A., which were both sculpted by veteran Imagineer Blaine Gibson.

Adventureland

Adventureland represents the mystery of exploring foreign lands and is themed to resemble the remote landscapes of Africa, Asia, the Middle East, South America and the South Pacific, with an extension resembling a Caribbean town square. It contains classic attractions such as Pirates of the Caribbean, Jungle Cruise, Walt Disney's Enchanted Tiki Room, Swiss Family Treehouse, and The Magic Carpets of Aladdin.

Frontierland

Frontierland is a romanticized portrayal of the American Old West, including cowboys and Native Americans, as well as the mysteries of the Rivers of America. It contains classic attractions such as Tom Sawyer Island, Big Thunder Mountain Railroad, and the Country Bear Jamboree. The land also contains shops such as Big Al's, Frontier Trading Post, Prairie Outpost and Supply, Briar Patch, and Splashdown Photos. Walt Disney World's Festival of Fantasy Parade begins in Frontierland and makes its way through several lands, eventually ending on Main Street, U.S.A., toward the front of the park.  Special design methods were used for the Splash Mountain structure which consists of an intricate steel structure supporting the facility.  The final design included computer simulations and dynamic analyses to meet strength and strict serviceability and safety requirements.

Splash Mountain closed in January 2023.

Liberty Square

Liberty Square is inspired by a colonial American town set during the American Revolutionary War. The Liberty Belle Riverboat travels down the park's Rivers of America. Liberty Square is home to such attractions as the Haunted Mansion and The Hall of Presidents.

Fantasyland

Fantasyland is themed in a medieval-faire/carnival style, in the words of Walt Disney: "Fantasyland is dedicated to the young at heart and to those who believe that when you wish upon a star, your dreams come true." Attractions include It's a Small World, Peter Pan's Flight, The Many Adventures of Winnie the Pooh, Mickey's PhilharMagic, Prince Charming Regal Carousel, and Mad Tea Party. From 2012 to 2014, Fantasyland was expanded to nearly double its size and new attractions and guest offerings were added, including sub-areas themed to Beauty and the Beast, Tangled, and The Little Mermaid. New attractions such as the Seven Dwarfs Mine Train and Under the Sea: Journey of the Little Mermaid were introduced.

Castle Courtyard
The original Fantasyland attractions left after the expansion was completed are located within the castle walls this courtyard area directly behind Cinderella Castle. Attractions here include: Mickey's PhilharMagic, Prince Charming Regal Carrousel, Princess Fairytale Hall, It's a Small World, Peter Pan's Flight, Mad Tea Party and The Many Adventures of Winnie the Pooh.

Storybook Circus
Part of Fantasyland, Storybook Circus is located at the former site of Mickey's Toontown Fair, and is based on elements from Dumbo (1941) and the Mickey Mouse universe. Attractions include The Barnstormer and Dumbo the Flying Elephant, which was removed from its former location on January 8, 2012. Also included is the Casey Jr. Splash 'n' Soak Station (a water play area themed to Casey Jr., the train from Dumbo). Storybook Circus began soft openings on March 12, 2012, with more parts opening on March 31.

Mickey's Toontown Fair closed permanently on February 11, 2011, to make way for Storybook Circus. Some elements of Mickey's Toontown Fair were demolished, and others were re-themed to fit the circus concept. An expanded Dumbo the Flying Elephant ride was built, with an interactive queue, and a second Dumbo ride was built next to it, in order to increase capacity. The Barnstormer at Goofy's Wiseacre Farm was re-themed to "The Great Goofini". A big top area was built for meet-and-greets, called Pete's Silly Sideshow. This attraction features Goofy as a stuntman, Daisy as a fortune-teller, Donald as a snake-charmer, Minnie as a Magician, and Pluto as a special performer. Storybook Circus opened with a "streetmosphere" circus act called The Giggle Gang, which had a two-year run from 2012 until 2014.

Enchanted Forest

The completion of the Enchanted Forest section of the park concluded the expansion of New Fantasyland. Included in the expansion was the dark ride attraction Under the Sea ~ Journey of the Little Mermaid, themed to Disney's 1989 film The Little Mermaid. The attraction is a near replica of the Disney California Adventure attraction, The Little Mermaid, Ariel's Undersea Adventure. There is also an area themed to Disney's 1991 film Beauty and the Beast, featuring the Beast's Castle with the dining experience Be Our Guest Restaurant (offering quick-service lunches and table service dinners), as well as Gaston's Tavern and Belle's cottage. This portion of the New Fantasyland officially opened on December 6, 2012. Snow White's Scary Adventures was removed to build Princess Fairytale Hall, a meet-and-greet. Another attraction themed to Snow White and the Seven Dwarfs called the Seven Dwarfs Mine Train opened in 2014. The attraction, which features Snow White's cottage and state-of-the-art audio-animatronics, is the very first roller coaster to move in a wobbling motion on track.

Tomorrowland

Tomorrowland is themed to an intergalactic city, a concept of the future inspired by the optimism and scientific advancements of the Space Age and Atomic Age. and the optimism of as seen from around the 1950s: rockets, UFOs and robots, etc. In the words of Walt Disney: "Tomorrow can be a wonderful age. Our scientists today are opening the door of the Space Age to achievements that will benefit our children and generations to come. The Tomorrowland attractions have been designed to give you an opportunity to participate in adventures that are a living blueprint of our future."  Classic current attractions include Space Mountain, Walt Disney's Carousel of Progress, Astro Orbiter, PeopleMover and the Tomorrowland Speedway. Other current attractions include Buzz Lightyear's Space Ranger Spin and Monsters, Inc. Laugh Floor. The TRON Lightcycle / Run roller coaster will be opening to the north of Space Mountain in a new area of Tomorrowland, and it will open as a part of the Disney 100 Years of Wonder celebration, in April 4, 2023, since the park's 50th-anniversary will ends on March 31, 2023. The ride will have previews from February 6 to March 3, 2023, exclusively for Walt Disney World employees.

Transportation and Ticket Center

Magic Kingdom lies more than a mile away from its parking lot, on the opposite side of the man-made Seven Seas Lagoon. Upon arrival, guests are taken by the parking lot trams to the Transportation and Ticket Center (TTC), which sells admission into the parks and provides transportation connections throughout the resort complex.

To reach the park, guests either use the Walt Disney World Monorail System, ferryboats, or Disney Transport buses, depending on the location of their hotel or parking lot. The three hotels closest to Magic Kingdom, Disney's Contemporary Resort, Disney's Polynesian Village Resort (which is connected to the Shades of Green resort by a walking path), and Disney's Grand Floridian Resort and Spa, use either the ferry or monorail system to travel to Magic Kingdom; a walking path also links the Contemporary Resort to the park. Guests staying at Disney's Wilderness Lodge and Disney's Fort Wilderness Campground can also ride a dedicated ferry boat to the Magic Kingdom docks. Guests of other hotels take buses to travel to the park, while guests who are not staying at any of the resort's hotels must use the monorail system or ferryboats to travel to the park from the Transportation and Ticket Center. Guests using ride-hailing services to travel to the park must transfer at the TTC or use the walking path from the Contemporary Resort, as ride-hailing vehicles cannot use the park's bus loops. The three ferries are clad in different trim colors and are named for past Disney executives: the General Joe Potter (blue), the Richard F. Irvine (red) and the Admiral Joe Fowler (green). The main monorail loop has two lanes. The outer lane is a direct nonstop loop between the TTC and Magic Kingdom, while the inner loop has additional stops at Disney's Contemporary Resort, Disney's Polynesian Village Resort, and Disney's Grand Floridian Resort & Spa. Epcot is accessible by a spur monorail line that was added upon that park's opening in 1982.

Attendance

Television adaptation
In 2012, Jon Favreau announced he was planning a film called Magic Kingdom. The film was described as “Night at the Museum at Disneyland,” meaning that the film would tell a story where all the characters at Disney come to life at night. Marc Abraham and Eric Newman of Strike Entertainment were scheduled to produce the film. Writer-producer Ronald D. Moore had previously written an original script for the project, which the studio eventually declined to use, stating that Favreau and a new screenwriter would develop a new script.

In 2021, it was announced that a new project, now developed as a television series for Disney+. Moore was brought back to develop the series which will see that the various lands in the Magic Kingdom are actually gateways to alternate worlds, thus setting up a shared universe. The first in the series will be The Society of Explorers and Adventurers (SEA).

In popular culture
Adventures in the Magic Kingdom, a 1990 video game for the Nintendo Entertainment System
Down and Out in the Magic Kingdom, a 2003 science fiction novel by Cory Doctorow
The Kingdom Keepers, a 2005 children's novel by Ridley Pearson
The Florida Project, a 2017 drama film by Sean Baker

See also
Mickey's Not-So-Scary Halloween Party
Mickey's Very Merry Christmas Party
Rail transport in Walt Disney Parks and Resorts
List of Magic Kingdom attractions
List of Walt Disney World Resort attractions

References

External links

 
Walt Disney Parks and Resorts
Walt Disney World
1971 establishments in Florida
Amusement parks in Greater Orlando
Tourist attractions in Greater Orlando
Amusement parks opened in 1971